Yevstratovka is a rural locality (a selo) and the administrative center of Yevstratovskoye Rural Settlement, Rossoshansky District, Voronezh Oblast, Russia. The population was 1,225 as of 2010. There are 12 streets.

Geography 
Yevstratovka is located 15 km southeast of Rossosh (the district's administrative centre) by road. Malaya Mezhenka is the nearest rural locality.

References 

Rural localities in Rossoshansky District